Sheila Bernette (occasionally Burnette) is an English singer and character actress on film, TV and radio.

She also appeared as herself in many TV productions, and is remembered as one of the regular practical jokers in the UK version of Candid Camera.

Very petite, she usually wore her hair up to increase her height. A competent singer she was a regular on variety shows such as the Good Old Days and The Black and White Minstrel Show and appeared in the Royal Variety Performance show of 1970.

Life
see

She was born Sheila Poncini on 30 March 1931 in the Marylebone district of London. Her parents were of Italian descent.

She entered television in 1955 and was popular and appeared as herself from 1968 in multiple UK television shows. Largely appearing in comedy roles she was a regular sidekick to many stars including Dick Emery and Leslie Crowther.

Over and above her film and television roles she was a regular performer at the Players' Theatre in Covent Garden.

In her Royal Variety Performance she was introduced by Leslie Crowther as a Russian defector ballerina "Natalia Nokemova" and performed the Dance of the Sugar Plum Fairy with Crowther playing a ballet/cricketer Freddie Trumanov.

Her final film role was in Driving Aphrodite in 2009, ironically repeated her 1961 role as the goddess Dorcas. Her final TV role was in Hotel Trubble in 2011. In the latter she appeared in every episode from 2008 to 2011 as the long-term hotel resident, Mrs Poshington.

She lives in North London .

TV roles
see
Fabian of the Yard (1955)
Arthur's Treasured Volumes (1960) with Arthur Askey as Agnes Barrett
The Angry Gods (1961) as Dorcas
Harpers West One (1962) as Pat Williams
Hancock (1963) as canteen lady with Tony Hancock
Walter and Connie (1963) as Janet
Hugh and I (1963 to 1966) as Jimmy's mother with Terry Scott and Hugh Lloyd
Dave's Kingdom (1964)
Crowther Takes a Look (1965) with Leslie Crowther
Beggar My Neighbour (1967) as Olive
BBC Show of the Week (1968) as herself
Two of a Kind (1968) three episodes as herself with Morecambe and Wise
The Good Old Days (1968 to 1983) regular performer
The Black and White Minstrel Show (1967-1969) as a regular singer
The Morecambe and Wise Show (1968)
The Saturday Crowd (1969) as singer in all 28 episodes
Sandler and Young's Kraft Music Hall (1970) as singer
From a Bird's Eye View (1970) as Mrs Cake
Crowther's Back in Town (1970) with Leslie Crowther
The Leslie Crowther Show (1971) as herself
Tarbuck's Luck (1972) with Jimmy Tarbuck
The Dick Emery Show (1972) in 4 episodes
Shut That Door! (1973) with Larry Grayson
Coronation Street (1973) as Sister Delaney
Candid Camera (1974) 29 episodes as the female joker
Nobody Does it Like Marti (1976) with Marti Caine
The Fall and Rise of Reginald Perrin (1977) as Gladys
Cooper, Just Like That (1978) as Tommy Cooper's stage assistant
Butterflies (1979) as keep-fit instructor
The Ballyskillen Opera House (1981) as Annie O'Kelly
Saturday Night at the Mill (1981) as performer
Punchlines! (1983) as herself
The Little and Large Show (1987-1990)
Virtual Murder (1992) as Mrs Hall
Uncle Jack and the Dark Side of the Moon (1992) as Miss Fortune
Agony Again (1995) as Faygey
The Queen's Nose (2001) as Gran's sister
Hotel Trubble (2008-2011) all 39 episodes as Mrs Poshington

Film roles
see
Sons and Lovers (1960) as Polly
Ticket to Paradise (1961) as Clarice
Daft as a Brush (1967) TV movie
The Magnificent Seven Deadly Sins (1971) as Mrs Spencer
Eskimo Nell (1975) as casting girl
Three for All (1975) as Rhoda
What's Up Nurse (1978) as Mrs Garrard
Car Trouble (1986)
Kin of the Castle (1987) TV movie, 
Driving Aphrodite (2009) as Dorcas

Documentaries
A Little of What You Fancy (1968)
This Is Your Life (1994) - episode on Leslie Crowther
Smile... This Was Candid Camera (2010)

Family

Not known.

References
 

1931 births
2021 deaths
People from Marylebone
British actors
British dancers
British people of Italian descent